Oren Patashnik (born 1954) is an American computer scientist. He is notable for co-creating BibTeX, and co-writing Concrete Mathematics: A Foundation for Computer Science. He is a researcher at the Center for Communications Research, La Jolla, and lives nearby in San Diego.  Oren and his wife Amy have three children, Josh, Ariel, and Jeremy.

History 

Oren Patashnik graduated from Yale University in 1976, and later became a doctoral student in computer science at Stanford University, where his research was supervised by Donald Knuth.

While working at Bell Labs in 1980, Patashnik  proved that Qubic can always be won by the first player. Using 1500 hours of computer time, Patashnik's proof is a notable example of a computer-assisted proof.

In 1985, Patashnik created the bibliography-system, BibTeX, in collaboration with Leslie Lamport, the creator of LaTeX. LaTeX is a system and programming language for formatting documents, which is especially designed for mathematical documents. BibTeX is a widely used bibliography-formatting tool for LaTeX. 
 
In 1988, Patashnik assisted Ronald Graham and Donald Knuth in writing Concrete Mathematics: A Foundation for Computer Science, an important mathematical publication and college textbook.

In 1990, he got his doctorate in computer science. His thesis paper was about "Optimal Circuit Segmentation for Pseudo-Exhaustive Testing" .

After the 2003 Cedar Fire destroyed 60% of the houses in his immediate neighborhood, his statistical study showed that houses with a wood-shake shingle roof did very badly, but surprisingly, so did houses with a Spanish-style, curved-red-tile roof.

Notes

References
 (PDF) "How to Win at Tic-Tac-Toe" (Mathellaneous, July 2005, University of Melbourne) - 11-page article with a section relating Patashnik's effort on Qubic
 Credits of Concrete Mathematics 

1954 births
Living people
American computer scientists
Jewish American scientists
Jewish scientists
Yale University alumni
Timothy Dwight College alumni
Stanford University alumni
BibTeX